The Main road 481 is a short bypass direction Secondary class main road near Debrecen, that connects the M35 motorway's Mikepércs junction to the Main road 47.

The road, as well as all other main roads in Hungary, is managed and maintained by Magyar Közút, state owned company.

See also

 Roads in Hungary

Sources

External links
 Hungarian Public Road Non-Profit Ltd. (Magyar Közút Nonprofit Zrt.)
 National Infrastructure Developer Ltd.

Main roads in Hungary
Hajdú-Bihar County